This is a list of the 128 deputies of the National Congress of Honduras elected in the 2009 general elections.

National Party of Honduras

Liberal Party of Honduras

Christian Democracy

Democratic Unification

Innovation and Unity Party

References

Lists of members of the National Congress of Honduras